Fastway were  a British heavy metal band formed in 1982 by former Motörhead guitarist "Fast" Eddie Clarke and UFO bassist Pete Way.

The band went through many line-up and member changes and founding member and bassist Pete Way left the band after receiving an opportunity to play with Ozzy Osbourne.

Career
In 1982, both guitarist "Fast" Eddie Clarke and bassist Pete Way had become disgruntled with their own bands and decided to work together in a new outfit. They recruited Humble Pie drummer Jerry Shirley, and the then-unknown vocalist Dave King. They took their name from a combination of the founding members' names. However, Way discovered that he could not break his recording contract with Chrysalis Records and then received an offer to play for Ozzy Osbourne; he left the band and did not record any songs. The band then brought in session bassist Mickey Feat and recorded their debut album Fastway (1983) (Feat was uncredited on the album).

After critical and commercial success, the band toured to promote the album (with one-time Fixx bassist Alfie Agius as their session bass player). The band then recruited Richard McCracken, formerly of Taste, as "permanent" bassist, and released another success in the form of All Fired Up the following year. After the hardships of touring, Shirley and McCracken subsequently left.

In 1985, Clarke and King reformed Fastway with a new line-up. Recruiting Shane Carroll (second guitar), Paul Reid (bass), and Alan Connor (drums) from Dave King's first band, Stillwood, this line-up released Waiting for the Roar. The record took an album-oriented rock approach instead of the driving bluesy-metal of the previous albums. The success of the record was limited, and it disappointed many fans. The same year, Fastway was approached to make the soundtrack for the heavy metal horror film, Trick or Treat. The film flopped, but the soundtrack re-established Fastway as a hard-hitting metal band. The soundtrack was a moderate success and stayed on the Billboard Top 200 chart for eleven months. The success of the soundtrack, combined with the little money the band received, caused in-fighting, and the group disbanded. King took most of the band with him and started Q.E.D., a more AOR-styled outfit. They released a two-track single.

Meanwhile, Clarke decided to restart Fastway again from scratch in 1988 using vocalist Lea Hart and session men, quickly releasing On Target in the same year, but it sold poorly.

In 1990, this duo of Clarke and Hart released Bad Bad Girls, employing various session musicians including members of Girlschool. It was widely ignored and sold poorly. After calling it a day in 1991, they released a perfunctory live album Say What You Will LIVE (an older recording, curiously with King on vocals). In 1998, Clarke and Hart reunited and released a reworked version of On Target, but there was no commercial success.

On 25 May 2007, Toby Jepson, former lead singer with Little Angels, announced he had accepted an approach from Fastway to perform lead vocal duties during the year's festival appearances. An updated line-up played the Sweden Rock Festival, Japanese Hard Rock Hell, and the Download Festival at Castle Donington. Besides guitarist Clarke and Jepson, the new band featured drummer Steve Strange (not to be confused with Visage singer Steve Strange) and John McManus (Mama's Boys).

In an interview with Komodo Rock at the Hard Rock Hell Festival in November 2007, Eddie Clark confirmed that he and Toby Jepson would be working on new material. He said "Toby and I are going to sit down and maybe do a few tunes over the winter. See if we can write some tunes." In 2008, Toby Jepson announced he would go on to front Scottish hard rockers Gun full-time.

In late 2010, "Fast" Eddie Clarke returned to the recording studio to record a new album with Toby Jepson, titled Eat Dog Eat. The album was released on 14 November 2011, by SPV/Steamhammer, and it is the first album of entirely new material from Fastway in over twenty years.

Clarke died on 10 January 2018, after a battle with pneumonia at the age of 67. No official statement about the disbandment or the future of Fastway has been made following his death. Two years and seven months later Way died on 14 August 2020.

Members

Lead & Rhythm Guitars

 "Fast" Eddie Clarke (1982-1991, 1998, 2007-2011, died 2018)

Vocals

 Dave King - lead vocals (1982-1986)

 Lea Hart - also rhythm guitar & bass (1988-1991, 1998)

 Toby Jepson - also rhythm guitar (2007-2010)

Bass Guitar
 Pete Way (1982)

 Alfie Agius (1983 - official touring member)

 Richard "Charlie" McCracken - bass (1983-1984, 1991)

 Paul Reid - bass (1985-1986)

 John McManus - bass (2007-2010)

Drums

 Jerry Shirley (1982-1984, 1991)

 Alan Connor (1985-1986)

 Steve Clarke (1987-1989)

 Steve Strange (2007-2010, died 2021)

Keyboards & Rhythm Guitar

 Shane Carrol (1985-1986)

Session musicians

Rhythm Guitar

 Kim MacAllifie (1990)

 Chris Bonacci (1990)

 Terry Thomas (1998)

Bass

 Mickey Feet (1983)

 Neil Murray (1988)

 Nibbs Carter (1998)

Drums

 Gary Ferguson (1998)

 Matt Eldridge (2010)

Keyboards

 Don Airey (1998)

 Paul Airey (1998)

Discography

Studio albums
 Fastway (1983) - US #31
 All Fired Up (1984)
 Waiting for the Roar (1986)
 Trick or Treat (1986)
 On Target (1988)
 Bad Bad Girls (1990)
 Eat Dog Eat (2011)

Singles and EPs
 "We Become One" (1983)
 "Say What You Will"  (1983)
 "Easy Livin'" (1983)
 "All Fired Up" (1984)
 "Tell Me" (1984)
 "The Stranger" (1984)
 "The World Waits for You" (1986)
 "A Fine Line" (1988)
 "I've Had Enough" (1990)
 "Bad Bad Girls" (1990)

References

External links
 Rock detector's band biography
 Official Fastway Myspace page
 Official Steve Clarke website
 Fast Eddie Clarke, Interview: "Back In The Saddle" October, 2011

1983 establishments in England
English glam metal musical groups
English hard rock musical groups
English heavy metal musical groups
Musical groups established in 1983
Musical groups disestablished in 2018
2018 disestablishments in England
Second British Invasion artists
Columbia Records artists
SPV GmbH artists
Enigma Records artists
Steamhammer Records artists